John Travers (born 16 March 1991 in Dublin) is an Irish athlete competing in middle-distance events. He finished seventh in the 1500 metres at the 2015 European Indoor Championships.

Competition record

Personal bests
Outdoor
800 metres – 1:50.90 (Tullamore 2012)
1500 metres – 3:37.27 (Dublin 2014)
One mile – 3:55.44 (Dublin 2014)
3000 metres – 7:58.51 (Dublin 2013)
5000 metres – 13:56.99 (Dublin 2013)
10,000 metres – 29:04.66 (Parliament Hill 2015)
3000 metres steeplechase – 9:40.30 (Tullamore 2013)

Indoor
800 metres – 1:51.47 (Athlone 2013)
1500 metres – 3:41.37 (Prague 2015)
One mile – 3:59.62 (New York 2015)
3000 metres – 7:55 (BU valentine Boston 2016)

References

1991 births
Living people
Sportspeople from Dublin (city)
Irish male middle-distance runners
Irish male steeplechase runners